The Pakistan women's national cricket team toured New Zealand and Australia in January and February 1997. They played New Zealand in two One Day Internationals and Australia in one One Day International, losing all three matches. The matches were the first ever played by a Pakistan women's national team, with a side put together by sisters Shaiza and Sharmeen Khan against strong opposition from groups within Pakistan. The team needed to play the three international matches on the tour to qualify for the 1997 World Cup.

Tour of New Zealand

Squads

Tour Matches
Pakistan Women played 12 tour matches in New Zealand, but only the two matches below have available scorecards:

50-over match: Canterbury v Pakistan

50-over match: Otago v Pakistan

WODI Series

1st ODI

2nd ODI

Tour of Australia

Squads

Only WODI

References

External links
Pakistan Women tour of New Zealand 1996/97 from Cricinfo
Pakistan Women tour of Australia 1996/97 from Cricinfo

Pakistan women's national cricket team tours
Women's international cricket tours of Australia
Women's international cricket tours of New Zealand
1997 in women's cricket